Jan Mašek (born 6 July 1978) is a Czech slalom canoeist who has competed at the international level since 1995.

Mašek won ten medals at the ICF Canoe Slalom World Championships with a gold (C1 team: 2002), two silvers (C1 team: 2006, 2014) and seven bronzes (Mixed C2: 2017, 2018, 2019, C1 team: 2003, 2005, 2007, 2010). He also won 6 medals in the C1 team event at the European Championships (2 golds, 2 silvers and 2 bronzes).

His partner in the mixed C2 boat is Veronika Vojtová.

World Cup individual podiums

References

2010 ICF Canoe Slalom World Championships 12 September 2010 C1 men's team final results – accessed 12 September 2010.

External links

Czech male canoeists
Living people
1978 births
Medalists at the ICF Canoe Slalom World Championships